Barlotti was a manufacturer of karts based in Reading, England, a successor of the kart developments at Buckler Cars of Crowthorne.

The company was run by Jack Barlow in converted stables in Lydford Road. Barlow had been apprenticed to Buckler, and led that company's efforts in kart building in the 1960s, before they closed. The last kart was built in 1990.

External links
 Barlotti racing kart register and owners club
 Barlotti.co.uk: Press cuttings on Jack Barlow

Kart manufacturers